The following is a list of pipeline accidents in the United States in 1991. It is one of several lists of U.S. pipeline accidents. See also: list of natural gas and oil production accidents in the United States.

Incidents 

This is not a complete list of all pipeline accidents. For natural gas alone, the Pipeline and Hazardous Materials Safety Administration (PHMSA), a United States Department of Transportation agency, has collected data on more than 3,200 accidents deemed serious or significant since 1987.

A "significant incident" results in any of the following consequences:
 Fatality or injury requiring in-patient hospitalization.
 $50,000 or more in total costs, measured in 1984 dollars.
 Liquid releases of five or more barrels (42 US gal/barrel).
 Releases resulting in an unintentional fire or explosion.

PHMSA and the National Transportation Safety Board (NTSB) post-incident data and results of investigations into accidents involving pipelines that carry a variety of products, including natural gas, oil, diesel fuel, gasoline, kerosene, jet fuel, carbon dioxide, and other substances. Occasionally pipelines are re-purposed to carry different products.

The following incidents occurred during 1991:
 1991 A crew installing a water main hit a 6-inch gas main at 450 psi of pressure in Novi, Michigan on January 2. Gas company workers were trying to install a sleeve over the failure when the gas exploded and burned, injuring 6 of the Gas Company crew. A telephone cable was also damaged, knocking out phone service for about 5-- customers.
 1991 On January 31, a Mobil Company crude oil pipeline ruptured near Valencia, California, spilling up to 75,000 gallons of crude oil. The same day, a report was released showing that particular pipeline had a 99.8% chance of a leak in the next 5 years.
 1991 On February 5, a backhoe hit a gas distribution line, next to apartments in Greendale, Wisconsin, causing an explosion & fire that killed 3 and injured 6 others.
 1991 Construction crews ruptured a propane pipeline, on March 2, forcing the evacuation of 2,500 from several subdivisions in Richland County, South Carolina for a time. There was no fire. The break was 5 feet from a pipeline marking sign.
 1991 On March 3, a Lakehead (now Enbridge) crude oil pipeline, near Grand Rapids, Minnesota, ruptured. More than 1,700,000 gallons of crude spilled onto a wetland and the Prairie River, a tributary of the Mississippi River. About 1,672,000 gallons of oil were eventually recovered. About  of oil had spilled from that pipeline from the early 1970s to 1991, per Minnesota records. A resident in the area noticed the smell of oil and alerted the local fire department. Approximately 300 people living in homes near the site were evacuated for safety, but were allowed to return to their homes later in the night.
 1991 On March 16, an anchor from a ship ruptured a Chevron Corporation pipeline offshore of El Segundo, California, spilling about 55,000 gallons of light oil. Wildlife was affected.
 1991 A Diamond Shamrock 10 inch crude oil pipeline ruptured in Knox City, Texas on June 8, spilling about 84,000 gallons of crude oil, with much of it entering the Brazos River. Heavy rains caused the pipeline to fail.
 1991 On June 24, excavation work at a Sunoco tank farm facility, in Berks County, Pennsylvania, caused a leak of about 12,900 gallons of petroleum products. 
 1991 A bulldozer hit a Chevron Corporation crude oil pipeline near Park City, Utah, on June 27. About 126,000 gallons of crude oil were spilled.
 1991 On June 29, about 54,222 gallons of fuel oil and gasoline leaked from a 10-inch Koch Industries pipeline in Portage County, Wisconsin, from a 3-inch crack. A previous significant leak had occurred on this pipeline in that area the year before. Local officials urged Koch to upgrade its leak monitoring equipment, and, the Office of Pipeline Safety ordered this pipeline to be shut down until tested. Koch later replaced  of that pipeline in the area. The original pipe was installed in 1988.
 1991 On June 30, an Amoco pipeline failed near Denver City, Texas, spilling 28,200 barrels of petroleum. The failure was caused by internal corrosion. 
 1991 On July 17, workers were removing a corroded segment of the Consumers Power Company's (CP) 10-inch transmission line pipeline in Mapleton, Michigan. As a segment of the pipeline was being removed, natural gas at 360-psig pressure exerted about 12 tons of force on an adjacent closed valve (H-143), causing it and a short segment of connected pipe to move and separate from an unanchored compression coupling. The force of the escaping gas killed one worker (a welder), injured five other workers, and collapsed a steel pit that housed valve H-143.
 1991 On August 30, an earth mover hit a 16-inch ExxonMobil pipeline near Beaumont, Texas, causing a leak that spilled about 19,000 gallons of crude oil. Nearby businesses were evacuated.
 1991 About  of crude oil spilled from a broken Amoco pipeline at a barge facility at High Island, Texas on September 5.
 1991 On September 7, a Sunoco pipeline failed from external corrosion, in Lancaster County, Pennsylvania. About 28,000 gallons of petroleum product was spilled.
The spill also forced Clinton and Whitmire, South Carolina, to use alternative water supplies.
 1991 On December 28, two explosions in rapid succession occurred in apartment No. 3 of a two-story, eight-apartment, wood-frame structure in Santa Rosa, California. Two people were killed and three others were injured. Fire after the explosions destroyed that apartment and three other apartments in the front of the building.

References

Lists of pipeline accidents in the United States